Will Day (born 5 June 2001) is a professional Australian rules footballer with the Hawthorn Football Club in the Australian Football League (AFL). Day is the grandson of 1971 VFL Grand Final premiership player Robert Day.

Early career

Will played his junior football at PHOS Camden Football Club. He moved to Glenelg for a year before moving on to West Adelaide. In 2019 he played for South Australia in the under 18 national championships, as well as playing three reserves games. He went to school at Sacred Heart College.

AFL career

Day's AFL career was initially hampered by the Covid-19 pandemic. As a young player coming into the system Day would normally start by playing with the Hawthorn affiliate Box Hill Hawks, but because that competition had been suspended for the year he had to show his mettle with scratch matches against other AFL clubs.

Day made his AFL debut in round 6, 2020, against  at Giants Stadium.
Day received a rising star nomination after round 16, 2020.

Statistics
Updated to the end of the 2022 season.

|-
| 2020 ||  || 30
| 11 || 1 || 1 || 100 || 72 || 172 || 48 || 15 || 0.1 || 0.1 || 9.1 || 6.5 || 15.6 || 4.4 || 1.4 || 0
|-
| 2021 ||  || 12
| 5 || 0 || 0 || 55 || 44 || 99 || 25 || 8 || 0.0 || 0.0 || 11.0 || 8.8 || 19.8 || 5.0 || 1.6 || 1
|-
| 2022 ||  || 12
| 17 || 3 || 1 || 169 || 104 || 273 || 68 || 33 || 0.2 || 0.1 || 9.9 || 6.1 || 16.1 || 4.0 || 1.9 || 0
|- class="sortbottom"
! colspan=3| Career
! 33 !! 4 !! 2 !! 324 !! 220 !! 544 !! 141 !! 56 !! 0.1 !! 0.1 !! 9.8 !! 6.7 !! 16.5 !! 4.3 !! 1.7 !! 1
|}

Notes

Honours and achievements
Individual
  best first year player (debut season): 2020
 AFL Rising Star nominee: 2020

References

External links

Living people
2001 births
West Adelaide Football Club players
Box Hill Football Club players
Hawthorn Football Club players
People educated at Sacred Heart College, Adelaide